Elba Mercedes Fahsbender Merino (born 29 December 1991 in Piura) is a Peruvian beauty pageant titleholder and model, elected Miss Perú World after participating in the event of Miss Peru 2012 to represent Peru in Miss World 2013. In 2014, she was appointed and crowned as Miss Earth Peru 2014. She represented Peru in Miss Earth 2014 pageant on November.

References

1991 births
Living people
People from Piura
Miss Earth 2014 contestants
Peruvian female models
Peruvian people of German descent
Miss World 2013 delegates
University of Piura alumni
21st-century Peruvian women